The International Young Physicists' Tournament (IYPT), sometimes referred to as the “Physics World Cup”, is a scientific competition between teams of secondary school students. It mimics, as close as possible, the real-world scientific research and the process of presenting and defending the results obtained.

Participants have almost a year to work on 17 open-ended inquiry problems that are published yearly in late July. A good part of the problems involves easy-to-reproduce phenomena presenting unexpected behaviour. The aim of the solutions is not to calculate or reach “the correct answer” as there is no such notion here. The Tournament is rather conclusions-oriented as participants have to design and perform experiments, and to draw conclusions argued from the experiments’ outcome.

The competition itself is not a pen-and-paper competition but an enactment of a scientific discussion (or a defence of a thesis) where participants take the roles of Reporter, Opponent and Reviewer, thus learning about peer review early on in their school years. Discussion-based sessions are called Physics Fights and the performances of the teams are judged by expert physicists.

Teams can take quite different routes to tackle the same problem. As long as they stay within the broadly defined statement of the problem, all routes are legitimate and teams will be judged according to the depths reached by their investigations.

The IYPT is a week-long event in which currently around 150 international pre-university contestants participate.

IYPT is associated with The European Physical Society (EPS) and in 2013, IYPT was awarded the medal of The International Union of Pure and Applied Physics (IUPAP) "in recognition of its inspiring and wide-ranging contribution to physics education that has touched many lives and countries, over the past 25 years".

Timeline table 

(*) the number of Nations can be disputed as some countries were midway towards a recognized independence

See also 
 IYPT 2011

Footnotes

External links 
 
 Official IYPT 2019 website

 
Youth science
Student quiz competitions
Physics organizations
Physics competitions
1988 establishments in Russia
Recurring events established in 1988